Nasser Asphalt (Wet Asphalt) is a 1958 West German thriller starring Horst Buchholz and featuring Gert Fröbe, written by Will Tremper and directed by Frank Wisbar.

Plot
The young journalist Bachmann (Horst Buchholz) is released from prison by the intervention of Cesar Boyd (Martin Held), a respected and prosperous journalist who hires him as his assistant. Bachmann had been in jail for his attempt to interview war criminals at Spandau prison. Bachmann works for Boyd who acts as his mentor, however, Bachmann’s stories are published under Boyd’s name.  Bettina (Maria Perschy), the daughter of a friend comes to study in Berlin and will stay at Boyd. Both Bachmann who picks her up at the airport and Boyd develop an interest in the young woman. In the commotion, a story that has to go out to a Paris newspaper is not prepared, and Boyd, after listening to a tale from his chauffeur Jupp (Gert Fröbe), in the last minute makes up a story of five German soldiers who have lived in a supply bunker in Poland for six years where they had gotten trapped when it was exploded at the end of the war. There is one survivor, now blind, who was brought to a hospital. The story becomes an international sensation and people want to know more. Journalists are sent to Poland to investigate. The Russians suspect the story to be a ruse to send spies. Pressure is put on the Polish government to release the blind soldier. In Germany, widows believe the blind soldier may be their missing husband.  Bachmann who initially thought that Boyd had reliable sources for his story, soon  recognizes that it is all a big lie. He breaks with his mentor, and tries to warn the public about the hoax. He convinces Bettina of Boyd’s lies, and both of them leave him to start a new beginning.

Cast
 Horst Buchholz as Greg Bachmann
 Martin Held as Cesar Boyd
 Maria Perschy as Bettina
 Gert Fröbe as Jupp
 Heinz Reincke as Der Blinde
 Inge Meysel as Gustl
 Peter Capell as Donnagan
 Renate Schacht as Wanda
 Richard Münch as Dr. Wolf

Comments
The black-and-white movie features Horst Buchholz who was already a star at this time and dubbed the German James Dean. Gert Fröbe has a supporting role. It also brought wider attention to Maria Perschy, and all three actors would soon move on to go to a Hollywood career before they would return to Europe. In contrast Frank Wisbar had come from Hollywood and Nasser Asphalt was one of several films he made in post-war Germany to deal with the lessons of the war and Germany's recent history. The film is set in war-scarred Berlin.

While the DVD version of the film is marketed as a film noir, it lacks the characteristic of the film noir genre.

In the English-dubbed version the site of the exploded bunker is given implausibly as Göttingen as a place  near Danzig (Gdansk) in Poland;  the German version has it as Gdingen (Gdynia).

Awards
1958 Film Award in Silver for "Outstanding Individual Achievement: Music", awarded to Hans-Martin Majewski.

References

External links
 

German black-and-white films
1958 films
West German films
Films set in Berlin
Films directed by Frank Wisbar
Films about journalists